Eupithecia subpulchrata is a moth in the family Geometridae. It is found in central Asia.

References

Moths described in 1883
subpulchrata
Moths of Asia